Adventures of Petrov and Vasechkin, Usual and Incredible is a 1983 Soviet two-part children's two-part musical comedy directed by Vladimir Alenikov. The plot tells of two friends-schoolboys, Petya Vasechkin and Vasya Petrov, about their attempts to assert themselves and about their friend, with whom they are in love, Masha Startseva.

A year later a sequel titled Vacation of Petrov and Vasechkin, Usual and Incredible was released.

Plot
Masha is the best student аt school. In class she receives an anonymous love letter. Meanwhile, Petrov comes to the blackboard and writes a sentence full of mistakes. Meanwhile Masha has corrected the spelling mistakes in the love letter. When she compares it to the mistakes Petrov made, she immediately realizes that the letter was from him. She rebuffs him by sending him a note saying that he must first learn how to write correctly.

Vasechkin wants to help his friend Petrov. Тhey read The Taming of the Shrew, which leads them wanting to tame Masha in a similar way. But Masha is far too smart not to see through the boys' plan. Frustrated, they stroll through the streets imagining what if they had special powers. They encounter a strange man, who turns out to have magic powers. He grants the boys three wishes altogether. Petrov wishes to be the strongest man in the world, and Vasechkin only wants to get perfect grades. The third wish is not yet granted to them, they are to mull over it.

And indeed, the wishes come true. However, incredible strength soon turns out to be rather disadvantageous for Petrov. And also Vasechkin does not enjoy his wish — although he only receives perfect grades, he has not actually become any smarter. Additionally, Masha is not impressed by the new skills of the boys. Eventually they want to become the same as they were before, but the wizard has disappeared. Masha helps them formulate their wish correctly and the boys lose their skills again.

The French class stages the Little Red Riding Hood in French. Masha plays the title character. Petrov is supposed to play the wolf, but because he had reported sick to skip an exam, Vasechkin takes over the role. When Petrov hears this, he sneaks to the performance, and so the Red Riding Hood suddenly faces two wolves. After the two guys ruin the show, they have even less of a chance with Mascha.

While the boys have to do a detention, Masha is awarded three times — as the best athlete of the school, as the best student in French and the best student paramedic. The boys then swear revenge. During the swimming class they think of a solution — Petrov is to pretend that he is drowning, while Vasechkin is to save him to receive a rescue medal, and thus divert attention from Masha. But the plan fails as it is Masha who saves both boys in the end.

And once again Masha is awarded, this time with a rescue medal. The boys realize that they can not outdo Masha. Instead, they focus on their abilities. While they have to do a detention again, they use the opportunity and beautify the classroom by hanging a wallpaper. And finally, they also attract the attention of Masha.

Cast

Main characters
Dmitri Barkov - Vasya Petrov
Egor Druzhinin - Petya Vasechkin (voiced by Igor Sorin)
Inga Ilm - Masha Startseva
Alexander Lenkov - janitor / wizard
Margarita Korabelnikova - Vasechkin's grandmother

Pupils
Maxim Polyansky - Goroshko
Svetlana Protasenkova - Luda Yablochkina
Andrei Kanevsky - Skvortsov
Alexey Gusev - Sidorov

Teachers
Inna Alenikova - teacher of French Inna Andreevna
Lyudmila Ivanova - teacher of Russian Alla Ivanovna
Tatyana Bozhok - geography teacher Emma Markovna
Victor Pavlovsky - teacher of labor Nikolai Ivanovich
Yury Medvedev - principal of the school
Vladislav Druzhinin - drawing teacher San Sanych
Viktor Lysenko - physical education teacher

Production
For the first time Petrov and Vasechkin appeared in 1974 in the children's magazine Yeralash, where Vladimir Alenikov worked at that time as director and screenwriter.

Casting for the film took place in Kiev, Moscow, Odessa and other cities. For the role of Vasechkin, the director found Yegor Druzhinin in Leningrad, who was son of the picture's choreographer Vladislav Druzhinin. After finding out that no one was yet cast for the second lead part, Yegor brought along his classmate Dima Barkov, who eventually became Petrov.

Release
When both pictures about the exploits of Petrov and Vasechkin had already been shot and voiced, the Moscow film bosses, after watching them, categorically forbade to release them on screens as the main characters of the films behaved in a way which was deemed as too "non-Soviet". And then Vladimir Alenikov decided to show the film to Irina Andropova, daughter of General Secretary Yuri Andropov, who at that time worked at a music magazine.

Arranging a meeting, Alenikov called the studio and asked to arrange a screening for the Andropov family. As soon as this information became known to officials, the issue of the release of the films was solved in a matter of hours. The premiere took place on June 1, 1984 at 16:30 on the First channel of the Soviet Central Television.

Awards

 1983, October 27–30 - XIV International Film Festival "Molodost-83" (Kiev)
 The main prize of the festival "For the best embodiment of the modern theme"
 Prize of the Central Committee of the Young Communist League of Ukraine "For the best embodiment of the youth theme"
 1983, October 30 - International Festival of Arts "Young Voices"
 Laureate of the International Festival of Arts "Young Voices" (Vladimir Alenikov)
 1984, July - XXII International Film Festival in Gijón (Spain)
 The main prize of the festival
 1984, October 28–31 - IV International Film Festival "Molodost-84" (Kiev)
 Prize of the State Television and Radio of the Ukrainian SSR "For the Best Television Film"
 1984, October 31 - International Festival of Arts "Young Voices"
 Laureate of the International Festival of Arts "Young Voices" (Vladimir Alenikov), for the film "Vacations of Petrov and Vasechkin"
 1985, September 25 - VIII International Film Festival of Children's Films in Bratislava
 Prize of the Danube'85
 1985, October 1 - IX All-Union Festival of Television Films (Kiev)
 Prize of the children's jury

References

External links

Soviet musical comedy films
1980s musical comedy films
1980s children's comedy films
Russian children's comedy films
Odesa Film Studio films
Films directed by Vladimir Alenikov
1983 comedy films
1983 films
Soviet children's films